Elsewhere for 8 Minutes is the debut studio album by Australian band Something for Kate. It was released in 1997 on Murmur. The title is a reference to the time it takes light travelling from the Sun to reach Earth. The band recorded the album at York St Studios in Auckland, New Zealand with producer Brian Paulson, whose previous credits included Wilco, Slint and Son Volt. Frontman Paul Dempsey said the band chose to record overseas to avoid being interrupted. "And it was cost-effective as well," he said. "The Australian dollar was better, the studio was fantastic–it just all worked out. And we didn't want to be in Melbourne." Bassist Julian Carroll, who had already decided to leave the band, remained for the recording but left soon after its completion.

Track listing

CD 
"Anarchitect" – 3:50
"Pinstripe" – 6:10
"Captain (Million Miles an Hour)" – 4:42
"Paintbrushes" – 4:48
"Prick" – 3:37
"Glass Timing" – 4:28
"Soundczech" – 6:12
"Working Against Me" – 4:41
"Strategy" – 5:57
"Roll Credit" – 4:13
"Like Bankrobbers" – 5:26
"The Last Minute" – 3:35

Vinyl

Side A 
"Anarchitect" – 3:50
"Pinstripe" – 6:10
"Captain (Million Miles an Hour)" – 4:42
"Paintbrushes" – 4:48
"Prick" – 3:37
"Roll Credit" – 4:13

Side B 
"Soundczech" – 6:12
"Working Against Me" – 4:41
"Strategy" – 5:57
"Like Bankrobbers" – 5:26
"The Last Minute" – 3:35

Deluxe edition bonus disc 
The 2014 deluxe edition included a bonus disc of all the albums B-Sides.

Track listing
"Subjected to Change" – 5:11
"Floatation" – 4:32
"Chapel Street Etc" – 4:34
"All the Things That Aren't Good About Scientology" – 3:58
"Telescope" – 6:38
"The Last Minute - Djinji Brown Remix" – 3:39
"Prickly - Eli Janney Remix" – 4:37
"3x2" – 6:41
"Friendly" – 3:50
"Clint" – 5:19
"Harpoon (Jebediah Cover)" – 4:20
"You Can't Please Everybody, Rockwell" – 4:48
"Just a Passenger" – 5:02

Personnel

Something for Kate
Paul Dempsey – guitar, keyboards, vocals
Julian Carroll – bass guitar
Clint Hyndman – drums

Additional personnel
Claudia Price – cello
Rodd Bamman – viola
Miranda Adams – violin
Jocelyn Healy – violin
Stephen Small – piano/piano accordion
Strings arranged by Stephen Small

Charts

Certifications

Release history

References

1997 debut albums
Something for Kate albums
Murmur (record label) albums
Albums produced by Brian Paulson